Annona tenuiflora  is a species of plant in the family Annonaceae. It is native to Brazil, Colombia, French Guiana and Venezuela. Carl Friedrich Philipp von Martius, the German botanist who first  formally described the species, named it after the slender ( in Latin) sepals and petals of its flowers.

Description
It is a tree that reaches greater than 9.75 meters in height.  Its leaves are 5.4-27 centimeters by 2.7-10.8 and have rounded tips. The leaves have a reddish underside and slightly wavy margins. Its peduncles are 2.7 - 4.1 centimeters long. Carl von Martius conjectured that it has male and female flowers. Its sepals are 2.25 millimeters long. Its flowers have 6 petals in two rows of three. Its pink, concave, oval petals are 1.8 centimeters long. It has numerous tightly packed stamens with hairs at their base, arranged on a conical receptacle. Its anthers are pink.

Reproductive biology
The pollen of A. tenuiflora is shed as permanent tetrads.

Habitat and distribution
It has been observed in woodland habitats.

Uses
It has been reported to be used to treat headache, dizziness and hypotension.

References

tenuiflora
Flora of Brazil
Flora of Colombia
Flora of French Guiana
Flora of Venezuela
Plants described in 1841
Taxa named by Carl Friedrich Philipp von Martius